Jacques Pellegrin (12 June 1873, Paris – 12 August 1944) was a French zoologist.

In Paris, he worked under zoologist Léon Vaillant (chair of reptiles and fishes) at the Muséum national d'histoire naturelle. From 1897, Pellegrin served as préparateur at the museum. He obtained doctorates in medicine (1899) and science (1904), and in 1908 was named as an assistant director.

After many missions abroad, he became sub-director of the museum in 1937, and replaced Louis Roule (1861–1942) as the chairperson of herpetology and ichthyology.

He published over 600 scientific books and articles and discovered around 350 new species. He named a number of fishes from the family Cichlidae, such as the genera Astatoreochromis, Astatotilapia, Boulengerochromis, Lepidiolamprologus, Nanochromis and Ophthalmotilapia.

Taxa named in his honor 
He has the following species named in his honor:
 The Clingfish Apletodon pellegrini 
 Enteromius pellegrini (Pellegrin's barb) 
 The Pike Cichlid Crenicichla pellegrini Ploeg, 1991
 The Yellow hump eartheater cichlid Geophagus pellegrini Regan, 1912
 Nemacheilus pellegrini

World War Activities
He fought with the French Partisans during World War II against the Wehrmacht, and was subsequently killed by an MG42 while trying to peep from his hiding spot.

Selected writings 
 Contribution à l'étude anatomique, biologique et taxinomique des poissons de la famille des cichlidés, 1903 – Contribution to the anatomical, biological and taxonomic study of fish of the family Cichlidae.
 Les Poissons du bassin du Tchad, 1912 – Fish of the Lake Chad basin.
 Les poissons des eaux douces de l'Afrique du Nord Française : Maroc, Algérie, Tunisie, Sahara, 1921 – Freshwater fish of French North Africa; Morocco, Algeria, Tunisia and the Sahara.
 Les poissons des eaux douces de l'Afrique occidentale : du Sénégal au Niger, 1923 – Freshwater fish of western Africa; Senegal and Niger.
 Poissons du Chiloango et du Congo, 1928 – Fish from the Chiloango and the Congo.
 Les poissons des eaux douces d'Asie-Mineure, 1928 – Freshwater fish of Asia Minor
 Les poissons des eaux douces de Madagascar et des îles voisines (Comores, Seychelles, Mascareignes), 1933 – Freshwater fish of Madagascar and neighboring islands (Comoros, Seychelles, Mascarenes).

See also 
 List of Chairs of the Muséum national d'histoire naturelle
 :Category:Taxa named by Jacques Pellegrin

Sources
 This article incorporates text from the German Wikipedia; sources listed as "Staatsbibliothek zu Berlin" & "Bayerische Staatsbibliothek München".

References

1873 births
1944 deaths
French zoologists
French taxonomists
French herpetologists
French ichthyologists
French science writers
20th-century French non-fiction writers
20th-century French zoologists
20th-century French male writers
National Museum of Natural History (France) people
French male non-fiction writers
Scientists from Paris